Charles Cassius Rogers (1849–1937) was a member of the Wisconsin State Senate.

Biography
Rogers was born on December 15, 1849, in Cambridge, Maine, and was educated at Bisbie Military Academy in Poughkeepsie, New York. He was a professor of mathematics at Eastman College, and president of the Association for Advancement of Milwaukee. He was also a member of the Milwaukee Chamber of Commerce. He died on May 11, 1937 after a fall.

Political career
Rogers was a Republican. He was elected to the Wisconsin Senate in 1902, receiving 7,380 votes against 5,739 votes cast for A. Huebschmann (a Democrat), and 1,758 votes cast for Vie Peterson.

References

1849 births
1937 deaths
People from Somerset County, Maine
Republican Party Wisconsin state senators